Samu Vilkman is a Finnish ice hockey player who currently plays professionally in Finland for Tappara of the SM-liiga.

References

External links

Living people
Tappara players
Year of birth missing (living people)
Finnish ice hockey forwards